Harpesaurus borneensis is a species of agamid lizard. It is endemic to Indonesia.

References

Harpesaurus
Reptiles of Indonesia
Reptiles described in 1924
Taxa named by Robert Mertens